Elimus is an Australian genus of potter wasps. It contains the following species:

 Elimus arabicus Meade-Waldo, 1910
 Elimus australis Saussure, 1852
 Elimus mackayensis Meade-Waldo, 1910
 Elimus papuanus Borsato & Giordani Soika, 1995

References

Biological pest control wasps
Potter wasps
Insects of Australia